This is a list of films produced by the Tollywood (Telugu language film industry) based in Hyderabad in the year 2003.

Box office

Released films

January–June

July–December

Dubbed films

References

2003
Telugu
Telugu